Hyloxalus mittermeieri is a species of frogs in the family Dendrobatidae. It is endemic to Peru and only known from the area of its type locality on the eastern slopes of the central Andes in the San Martín Region. Its natural habitats are tropical montane forests near streams. It is only known from two specimens, from  asl on the road between Rioja and Balzapata.

Description
Body is moderately robust.

References

mittermeieri
Amphibians of the Andes
Amphibians of Peru
Endemic fauna of Peru
Amphibians described in 1991
Taxonomy articles created by Polbot